Commercial Times is a Chinese-language financial newspaper published in Taiwan and owned by the Want Want China Times Media Group. It is currently the biggest financial paper on the island. Because of its location in Taiwan, it is often a source for breaking news about the electronics and high-tech manufacturing industry.

See also
 Media of Taiwan

References

External links
 

1978 establishments in Taiwan
Business newspapers published in Taiwan
Chinese-language newspapers
Mass media in Taipei